The Capture of Oujda in 1647 opposed the forces of the Alaouite Sharif Sultan Moulay Mohammed to the Turks of Algiers. It lead to the capture of the city of Oujda by the Alaouite Sultanate of Tafilalt, then an expanding political force in the Maghreb.

Battle 
Following the sack of Sijilmassa and his defeat against the Dilaites in Fez,

References 

1647